Gilad Landau is a former Israeli footballer, who became an All American Placekicker at Grambling State Tigers in the early 1990s.

References

1968 births
Living people
Israeli footballers
Maccabi Netanya F.C. players
Grambling State Tigers football players

Association footballers not categorized by position